Felts Mills is a hamlet and census-designated place (CDP) in the town of Rutland of Jefferson County, New York, United States. The population was 372 at the 2010 census. Felts Mills' original name was "Mid Road" because it is close to the halfway point between Watertown and Carthage.

History 
Felts Mills was sited on one of several natural falls on the Black River and first settled with the construction of a gristmill in about 1800. An improved dam was erected in 1821, and a stone mill in the following year. In 1824, John Felts constructed the large sawmills that gave the town its name. In 1889, the Taggart Paper Company built a large paper mill on an island across the river, ruins of which are still visible today.

Geography
The community is in the northeast corner of the town of Rutland, east of the center of Jefferson County. New York State Route 3 passes through the CDP, leading west  to Watertown, the county seat, and east  to Carthage.

Demographics

References

External links
 Photos of the extensive remains of the mill ruins and island across from Felts Mills:  

Hamlets in New York (state)
Census-designated places in Jefferson County, New York
Census-designated places in New York (state)
Hamlets in Jefferson County, New York